Gyor may refer to:

 Győr, a city in the north-west of Hungary
 Győr-Moson-Sopron, the administrative county in Hungary which the above city resides in
 Győr (county), the historic administrative county of the Kingdom of Hungary in present-day north-western Hungary and south-western Slovakia
 Győr-Pér International Airport, an international airport situated near Győr city
Győr (genus)

See also 
 Vib Gyor, a band from Leeds, England